Cem Özdemir (born 27 July 1992) is a Turkish footballer who plays for TFF Second League club Isparta 32 Spor.

Cem made one appearance for Turkey national under-20 football team, in a 1-0 win over the Ukraine U20s.

References

External links

1992 births
People from Seyhan
Living people
Turkish footballers
Turkey youth international footballers
Association football midfielders
Adanaspor footballers
Sivasspor footballers
Kardemir Karabükspor footballers
Manisa FK footballers
Vanspor footballers
Fethiyespor footballers
Süper Lig players
TFF First League players
TFF Second League players
TFF Third League players